Naval Support Facility Diego Garcia is a British Ministry of Defence facility leased to the United States Navy, located on the atoll Diego Garcia in the Indian Ocean. 

Camp Thunder Cove is part of the facility, and is operated by the United States Armed Forces and British Armed Forces.

Mission
Naval Support Facility Diego Garcia provides Base Operating Services to tenant commands located on the island. The command's mission is "To provide logistic support to operational forces forward deployed to the Indian Ocean and Persian Gulf AORs in support of national policy objectives."

As of January 2012, the facility supported the following tenant commands:

Maritime Pre-Positioning Ships Squadron TWO
Branch Health Clinic
Naval Computer And Telecommunications Station Far East Detachment Diego Garcia
Naval Mobile Construction Battalion Detachment
Naval Media Center Detachment Diego Garcia
Military Sealift Command Office Diego Garcia
Mission Support Facility
Fleet Logistics Center Diego Garcia
NAVFAC Public Works Department
As of March 2015, the submarine tender USS Emory S. Land (AS-39) is forward deployed to Diego Garcia.

History
In 1971, the local population of Diego Garcia, the Chagossians, was forcibly removed from the island to make way for the base.

The Navy tasked the Seabees of Naval Mobile Construction Battalions 1, 40, 62, 71, 133 and Amphibious Construction Battalion 2 with the construction of the base.  On 23 January 1971 the first men of NMCB 40 arrived on site to begin what became an extended project.  Naval Support Facility Diego Garcia, was established as the senior United States Navy command on the island on 1 October 1977. At the time the NAVCOMMSTA was the primary tenant, but as new major facilities were completed, most notably the expanded anchorage and mooring area and the extended airfield, other tenants were commissioned.
In 1980, the United States Navy established the Near-Term Prepositioned Force of 16 ships. Then NTPF became the Afloat Prepositioning Force (AFP) and eventually Maritime Prepositioning Ship Squadron Two (MPSRON 2) consisting of 20 deep-water pre-positioned logistics ships anchored in the lagoon.

In 1981, the naval air facility was commissioned. It was decommissioned in 1987 and its responsibilities returned to the Naval Support Facility Diego Garcia.

In 1982, construction activities were transferred from the Seabees to a consortium of civilian contractors, Raymond International, and Brown and Root and Molem, a joint venture. Raymond had deep-draft wharf and waterfront skills, Brown and Root had concrete and infrastructure skills, and Molem was an English firm known for taking on challenging projects. The majority of the projects were completed by 1988.

On 26 March 1982, Barbara Shuping and five other women were assigned to the Naval Support Facility Diego Garcia. Prior to this assignment, no women had lived on the island since those on the plantation in 1971.

In 1985; the new port facilities were completed and the USS Saratoga (CV-60) was the first aircraft carrier to tie up.

The Strategic Air Command began deploying Boeing B-52 Stratofortress bombers and aerial refueling aircraft to the newly completed airfield facilities in 1987.

Following the Iraqi invasion of Kuwait in August 1990, three ships of COMPSRON 2 sortied, delivering a Marine Expeditionary Brigade to Saudi Arabia for participation in the Gulf War. Other COMPSRON 2 ships offloaded the ammunition and fuel on Diego Garcia that were required for the American bomber fleet that deployed to the airfield. One of the B-52s crashed from mechanical failures just north of the island with the loss of three of its six-man crew.

Beginning on 7 October 2001, the United States again commenced military operations from Diego Garcia using B-1, B-2, and B-52 bombers to attack Taliban and al-Qaeda targets in Afghanistan following the September 11 attacks on the World Trade Center and the Pentagon. The base played an important role in the invasion of Afghanistan until the U.S.-led coalition could establish forward bases in the country because many countries closer to Afghanistan such as Turkey, Pakistan, and Saudi Arabia refused to allow United States air bases in their territory to be used for combat operations. On 12 December 2001, a B-1 bomber was lost to mechanical failures just after takeoff from the island, but the crew survived and was rescued by the USS Russell (DDG-59). Four B-2 Shelter System Extra Large Deployable Aircraft Hangar Systems were erected at Diego Garcia to support the bombers' operations. Combat operations resumed in the spring of 2003, with MPSRON 2 sortieing to the Persian Gulf for the Iraq War, and bombing operations began again, this time against Iraq. Bomber operations ceased from Diego Garcia on 15 August 2006.

Based units 
Flying and notable non-flying units based at Naval Support Facility Diego Garcia.

Units marked GSU are Geographically Separate Units, which although based at Diego Garcia, are subordinate to a parent unit based at another location.

United States Navy 
 Naval Computer and Telecommunications Station, Far East
 Detachment Diego Garcia
 Naval Support Facility Diego Garcia
Military Sealift Command
 Maritime Pre-positioning Ship Squadron Two
Fleet and Industrial Supply Center
 Diego Garcia Detachment

United States Space Force 
Space Operations Command (SpOC)

 Space Delta 2
 20th Space Control Squadron
 Detachment 2 (GSU)
Space Delta 6
 21st Space Operations Squadron
 Detachment 1 (GSU)

United States Air Force 
Pacific Air Forces (PACAF)

 Eleventh Air Force
 36th Wing
 36th Mission Support Group
 Detachment 1 (GSU)

Air Mobility Command (AMC)

 United States Air Force Expeditionary Center
 515th Air Mobility Operations Wing
 515th Air Mobility Operations Group 
 730th Air Mobility Squadron
 Detachment 1 (GSU)

Royal Navy 
 British Forces British Indian Ocean Territories

Military contracting 
KBR runs base operations support services at Naval Support Facility Diego Garcia. Serco Inc., of Herndon, Virginia, operates and maintains the Ground-based Electro-Optical Deep Space Surveillance (GEODSS), which tracks deep-space satellites.

Recent construction in support of US military activities on Diego Garcia has included:

 Black Construction/Mace International JV building a 34-metre antenna facility (expected completed by April 2021) and two new 13-metre radomes (expected completed by February 2021). 
 Black Construction/Mace International JV repairing deep-draft wharf infrastructure (expected completed by September 2023).
 San Juan-Black & Veatch International Ltd. JV, of Montrose, Colorado, repairing the north parking apron (expected completed by May 2022).
 SJC-BVIL moving underground the power and telephone lines that run from the Navy ammunition area to the Air Force ammunition area along DG1 (expected completed by September 2022).

Supplementary work at the facility includes Poole Fire Protection of Olathe, Kansas, testing and inspecting fire protection systems (June 2020 – June 2025); Jacobs/B&M JV architect-engineer services, specifically design, engineering, specification writing, cost estimating (July 2020 – July 2025); and InSynergy Engineering Inc. utility system studies (September 2020 – September 2025).

References

Further reading
 Ladwig III, Walter C., Andrew S. Erickson, and Justin D. Mikolay,"Diego Garcia and American Security in the Indian Ocean," in Carnes Lord and Andrew Erickson Rebalancing US Forces: Basing and Forward Presence in the Asia Pacific Annapolis, MD: Naval Institute Press, 2014, pp. 131–180.
 Ladwig III, Walter C., 
Urish, Daniel W., Coral, Copra, and Concrete: An Illustrated Memoir of Diego Garcia Atoll (2015).
US Naval Support Facility Diego Garcia "Integrated Natural Resources Management Plan," September 2005.

External links

Maritime Prepositioning Ship Squadron Two, Diego Garcia (Official Site)
Naval Support Facility, Diego Garcia (Official Site)

Chagos Archipelago
Transport in the British Indian Ocean Territory
Military installations of the United States in the United Kingdom
United States Navy installations
Space Shuttle Emergency Landing Sites
Military of the British Forces British Indian Ocean Territories